Euphoria fulgida, the emerald euphoria, is a species of scarab beetle in the family Scarabaeidae. It is found in North America.

Subspecies
These four subspecies belong to the species Euphoria fulgida:
 Euphoria fulgida fulgida (Fabricius, 1775)
 Euphoria fulgida fuscocyanea Casey, 1915
 Euphoria fulgida holochloris Fall, 1905
 Euphoria fulgida limbalis Fall, 1905

References

Further reading

External links

 

Cetoniinae
Articles created by Qbugbot
Beetles described in 1775
Taxa named by Johan Christian Fabricius